Lar (also Romanized as Lār; also known as Lārī, Īl Ārī, and Iliari) is a village in Rudqat Rural District, Sufian District, Shabestar County, East Azerbaijan Province, Iran. At the 2006 census, its population was 530, in 102 families.

References 

Populated places in Shabestar County